The Abhira tribe is mentioned in the ancient Indian epic Mahabharata. A historical people of the same name are mentioned in the Periplus of the Erythraean Sea. They are thought to be people who moved in from eastern Iran in the aftermath of the invasion of Alexander the Great. Their main base was in the Indus delta (modern Sindh and Kathiawar), where their country is mentioned as "Abiria" and "Aberia" in classical sources. There were also other communities of Abhiras in modern Haryana.

Etymology
Etymologically, he who can cast terror on all sides is called an Abhira.,

History
Sunil Kumar Bhattacharya says that the Abhiras are mentioned in the first-century work of classical antiquity, the Periplus of the Erythraean Sea. He considers them to be a race rather than a tribe. Scholars such as Ramaprasad Chanda believe that they were Indo-Aryan peoples. but others, such as Romila Thapar, believe them to have been indigenous. The Puranic Abhiras occupied the territories of Herat; they are invariably juxtaposed with the Kalatoyakas and Haritas, the peoples of Afghanistan.

According to Jayant Gadkari tribes such as Vrusni, Andhaka, Satvatas and Abhiras after a period of long conflicts came to be known as Yadavas.

In the Padma-puranas and certain literary works, the Abhiras are referred to as belonging to the race of Krishna.
 
There is no certainty regarding the occupational status of the Abhiras, with ancient texts sometimes referring to them as warriors, pastoral and cowherders but at other times as plundering tribes.

Along with the Vrishnis, the Satvatas and the Yadavas, the Abhiras were followers of the Vedas, who worshipped Krishna, the head and preceptor of these tribes.

In archaeological inscriptions Abhiras are mentioned as belonging to the race of Lord Krishna. According to K. P. Jayaswal the abhiras of Gujarat are the same race as Rastrikas of Emperor Asoka and Yadavas of the Mahabharatha.

Rule of the Konkan 
From 203 to 270 the Abhiras ruled over the whole of the Deccan Plateau as a paramount power. The Abhiras were the immediate successors of the Satavahanas.

Nepali branch 
Before the 12th century, an Ahir dynasty ruled some areas in what is now Nepal. According to Gopalarājvamshāvali, the genealogy of ancient Gopala dynasty compiled circa 1380s, Nepal is named after Nepa, a cowherd who is believed to have founded the Nepali branch of the Abhiras.

Connection to modern Ahirs
According to Ganga Ram Garg, the modern-day Ahir caste are descendants of Abhira people and the term Ahir is the Prakrit form of the Sanskrit term Abhira. Bhattacharya says that the terms Ahir, Ahar and Gaoli are current forms of the word Abhira. This view gets support in many writings.

M. S. A. Rao and historians such as P. M. Chandorkar and T. Padmaja have explained that epigraphical and historical evidence exists for equating the Ahirs with the ancient Abhiras and Yadava tribe.

Legendary figures in Hinduism

Two major Hindu goddess are said to be associated with the Abhira tribe.

As a goddess, Gayatri is the personified form of popular Vedic hymn, Gayatri Mantra. According to the medieval Sanskrit text Padma Purana, the storm god Indra brought Gayatri, an Abhira girl, to Pushkar to help Brahma in a yajna, a ritual sacrifice. During the ceremony she became Brahma's second wife.

Historian Ramaprasad Chanda argued in 1916 that the goddess Durga evolved from "syncretism of a mountain-goddess worshiped by the dwellers of the Himalaya and the Vindhyas", a deity of the Abhiras conceptualised as a war-goddess.

Abhiras of Gupta empire 

During the reign of Samudragupta (c. 350), the Abhiras lived in Rajputana and Malava on the western frontier of the Gupta empire. Historian Dineshchandra Sircar thinks of their original abode was the area of Abhiravan, between Herat and Kandahar, although this is disputed. Their occupation of Rajasthan also at later date is evident from the Jodhpur inscription of Samvat 918 that the Abhira people of the area were a terror to their neighbours, because of their violent demeanour. Abhiras of Rajputana were sturdy and regarded as Mlecchas, and carried on anti-Brahmanical activities. As a result, life and property became unsafe. Pargiter points to the Pauranic tradition that the Vrishnis and Andhakas, while retreating northwards after the Kurukshetra War from their western home in Dwarka and Gujarat, were attacked and broken up by the rude Abhiras of Rajasthan.

The Abhiras did not stop in Rajasthan; some of their clans moved south and west reaching Saurashtra and Maharashtra and taking service under the Satavahana dynasty and the Western Satraps. Also founded a kingdom in the northern part of the Maratha country, and an inscription of the ninth year of the Abhira king Ishwarsena.

See also
Abhira dynasty
Ishwarsena

References

Sources
 
 
 
 
 
 
 
 
History of Haryana
History of Rajasthan
History of Uttar Pradesh
Ancient peoples of India
Ancient peoples of Nepal